Yakkabogʻ is a city in Yakkabogʻ District of Qashqadaryo Region in Uzbekistan. It is the administrative center of Yakkabogʻ District. The town population was 17,402 people in 1989, and 20,600 in 2016.

References

Populated places in Qashqadaryo Region
Cities in Uzbekistan